Kondaveedu Stream (commonly known as : Kondaveetivagu) is a  long drain in Guntur district. It originates at Kondaveedu hills and drains in Krishna river near Undavalli.

References 

Rivers of Andhra Pradesh
Amaravati
Rivers of India